Patricia Monaghan is  Regius Professor of Zoology in the Institute of biodiversity, animal health & comparative medicine at the University of Glasgow.

Biography
Monaghan was educated at Durham University where her PhD investigated the utilisation of urban resources by the herring gull Larus arqentatus.

She delivered the Tinbergen Lecture for ASAB in 2006 and the Witherby Memorial Lecture for the British Trust for Ornithology (BTO) in 2004.

In 2011 she was appointed a member of the Academia Europaea (MAE).

Research
Monaghan's research interests are in behavioural ecology, avian ecology, ornithology, molecular ecology and senescence. She has served as president of Association for the Study of Animal Behaviour (ASAB) since 2017.

Awards and honours
1997: Fellow of the Royal Society of Edinburgh (FRSE)
2002: Corresponding Fellow of the American Ornithologists Union
2017: Godman-Salvin Medal by the British Ornithologists' Union
2017: Frink Medal by Zoological Society of London
2015: ASAB Medal

References

External links
Official biography

Fellows of the Royal Society of Edinburgh
Members of Academia Europaea
Living people
Year of birth missing (living people)
Alumni of Durham University